The 1913 Penn State Nittany Lions football team represented the Pennsylvania State University in the 1913 college football season. The team was coached by Bill Hollenback and played its home games in New Beaver Field in State College, Pennsylvania. Following a 26-game unbeaten streak for Hollenback (not the program, which had losses in 1910), the Nittany Lions closed out the 1913 season with six straight losses.

Schedule

References

Penn State
Penn State Nittany Lions football seasons
Penn State Nittany Lions football